Lise de la Salle (born 8 May 1988) is a French classical pianist.

Career 

De la Salle first performed aged 9 on Radio France. At 12 years old, she won the First Prize of the Seventh International Contest of Ettlingen, Germany. She is also a prize winner of the Natexis Banques Populaires Foundation, and won First Prize of "European Young Concert Artists" in Paris in October 2003, and First Prize of the Young Concert Artists International Auditions in New York in January 2004. She became "an international solo pianist very early".

She has been taught since 1998 by Pascal Nemirovski.

References

External links 
 
 
 
"Ich wollte immer gewinnen" merkur-online.de 
Lise de la Salle pianobleu.com 
Lise de la Salle management 

1988 births
Living people
People from Cherbourg-Octeville
Conservatoire de Paris alumni
21st-century French women classical pianists